Christofer Erixon, also known as Chris Hope, is a multi million selling Swedish songwriter, composer and music producer based in Trollhättan, Sweden. Mr Erixon has written songs for Asian artists like Arashi, Sandaime J Soul Brothers, Kis-My-Ft2, Generations and Hey! Say! JUMP In 2013 he contributed with 4 songs to the Arashi album Love which won album of the year in Japan and became the number one selling album in the world when released.

Selected discography

References 

Swedish songwriters
Living people
1987 births